Take-out is food purchased at a restaurant that the purchaser intends to eat elsewhere.

Take Out or Takeout may also refer to:
 Take Out (2004 film), independent film co-written and directed by Sean Baker and Shih-Ching Tsou
 Google Takeout, a project by the Google Data Liberation Front
 Takeouts (juggling), a juggling pattern
The Takeout, a news podcast hosted by Major Garrett
The Takeout (website), a food website of G/O Media
To take (someone) out or take out a target, assassination
To take (someone) out, dating

See also
Take away (disambiguation)